Češinovo-Obleševo is a municipality in eastern part of North Macedonia. The seat of the municipality is the village of Obleševo. Češinovo-Obleševo is part of the Eastern Statistical Region.

Geography
The municipality borders Municipality of Kočani and Municipality of Zrnovci to the east and Municipality of Probištip and Municipality of Karbinci to the west.

History
By the 2003 territorial division of Macedonia, Češinovo Municipality was attached to Obleševo Municipality, forming the new municipality named Češinovo-Obleševo.

Demographics
According to the 2002 Macedonian census, there are 7,490 people in the Municipality of Češinovo-Obleševo. Ethnic groups in the municipality:
Macedonians = 7,455 (99.5%)
others = 35 (0.5%)

Inhabited places
The number of the inhabited places in the municipality is 14.

References

External links
Official website

 
Municipalities of North Macedonia
Eastern Statistical Region